Cardone is a surname of Italian origin. The name may refer to:

Alberto Cardone (1920–1977), Italian film director of spaghetti western films
Christopher Cardone (born 1957), American Archbishop of the Roman Catholic Church in the Solomon Islands
Giuseppe Cardone (born 1974), Italian football player
J. S. Cardone (born 1946), American film director and producer
Kathleen Cardone (born 1953). United States District Judge for Texas
Nathalie Cardone (born 1967), French actress
Raffaele Cardone (born 1934), Italian opera singer and director
Vivien Cardone (born 1993), American actress

Italian-language surnames